The 2018 IBSA World Blind Football Championship is a blind football tournament and the seventh World Blind Football Championship. The competition was staged in Spain between 7 June and 17 June 2018, and involved sixteen teams of visually impaired players from around the world competing to be crowned world champion. It was won for the fifth time by Brazil, who defeated their fellow finalists, Argentina, 2-0 to take the title.

The tournament
The tournament got under way on 7 June with the opening match between Spain and Thailand. Brazil won the tournament after beating Argentina 2-0 in the final on 17 June. It was the fifth occasion on which Brazil have won the competition, and their team's striker, Ricardo Alves, was named Player of the tournament. China was awarded the fair play award.

Draw

Group stage

Group A

Group B

Group C

Group D

Knockout stage

9th–16th place match

Quarter-finals

Final ranking

References

http://www.madrid.blindfootballworldcup.com/championship-organization-and-information/ 

2018
2018 in association football
2017–18 in Spanish football
2018